Oscar Dyson may refer to:

Oscar E. Dyson (1913–1995), American fisherman and fishing industry leader in Alaska
NOAAS Oscar Dyson (R 224), an American fisheries and oceanographic research ship in commission in the National Oceanic and Atmospheric Administration fleet since 2005